Luc De Grauwe (born 22 December 1956) is a Belgian racing cyclist. He rode in the 1981 Tour de France.

References

1956 births
Living people
Belgian male cyclists
Place of birth missing (living people)